Hilltowns in Northern Italy

 Val d'Aosta
Antagnod
Bard
 Piedmont
Mombaldone
Neive
Orta San Giulio
Ricetto di Candelo
Vogogna
Volpedo
 Liguria
Ameglia
Apricale
Arcola
Castelnuvo Magra
Castelvecchio
Cervo
Cornice
Corniglia
Millesimo
Nicola
Ortonovo
Pigna
Trebbiano
Triora
Vezzano Ligure
 Lombardia
Bienno
Castellaro Lagusello
Cornello dei Tasso
Fortunago
Gradella
Lovere
Monte Isola
Oramala
Zavattarello
 Trentino-Alto Adige/Südtirol
Rango
 Veneto
Arquà Petrarca
Asolo
Borghetto
Portobuffolé
 Friuli Venezia Giulia
Clauiano
Cordovado
Fagagna
Gradisca d'Isonzo
Poffabro
 Emilia Romagna
Brisighella
Castell'Arquato
Compiano
Dozza
Montefiore Conca
Montegridolfo
Vigoleno

Italy geography-related lists